The 1966 United States Senate election in Rhode Island took place on November 8, 1966. Incumbent Democratic U.S. Senator Claiborne Pell successfully sought re-election, defeating Republican Ruth M. Briggs with 67.66% of the vote.

Primary elections 
Primary elections were held on September 13, 1966.

Democratic primary

Candidates 
Claiborne Pell, incumbent U.S. Senator

Results

Republican primary

Candidates 
Ruth M. Briggs, former lieutenant colonel in the Women's Army Corps (WAC)
Charles H. Eden

Results

General election

Results

References

Bibliography

External links

Rhode Island
1966
1966 Rhode Island elections